Robbs Creek flows into the Sacandaga River near Speculator, New York.

References 

Rivers of New York (state)
Tributaries of the Sacandaga River